Uzbekistan is a country in Central Asia with a growing demand for electricity. Solar power can play a role in meeting this demand, as the country has abundant solar resources and a strong potential for solar energy generation. The government of Uzbekistan has implemented several initiatives to promote the use of solar power, including the development of large-scale solar power plants and the introduction of incentives for individuals and businesses to install solar panels. Some of the benefits of solar power in Uzbekistan include reduced dependence on fossil fuels, lower greenhouse gas emissions, and improved energy security.

Government Policies 
The Law on the Use of Renewable Energy Sources (RES Law, 2019), introduced in May 2019, sets the fundamental framework for faster RES development. It specifies the guidelines and support schemes for renewable energy producers and defines the obligations of governmental bodies in promoting renewable energy.

Potential 

Uzbekistan has great potential for solar energy due to its high levels of solar radiation and large areas of barren land that can be used for solar power plants. The country receives an average of around 300 sunny days per year, making it an ideal location for solar power generation.

Tashkent Sun Hours/day 
Termez Sun Hours/day
Source: ECMWF Data

Photovoltaics

Large scale photovoltaic power stations

Current

Future

Rooftop 
In addition to mega-scale solar projects, small- to medium-scale solar projects including rooftop solar PV become attractive to developers and consumers thanks to appropriate policy targets and measures. Off-grid solar energy systems could secure clean energy supply in remote areas with good solar resources but no access to the grid.

Residential Solar PV 
Uzbekistan is actively developing, with the assistance of the World Bank, a targeted program to install two-kilowatt solar panels in 150,000 private houses. Installation work is planned to be carried out in 2021-2023. Also, funds were allocated by local governments for the installation of solar panels in the apartments of low-income families. Because the cost of installing solar panels is high relative to the income of the population, they are not becoming widely popular despite state subsidies.

Non-residential PV 
Installation of Solar panels on schools, governmental offices, hospitals and public buildings is accelerated by The Law on the Use of Renewable Energy Sources (adopted in May 2019). The Cabinet of Ministers of Uzbekistan has joined the "green" energy with installing 0,63MWh solar photovoltaic station at the building of the Cabinet of Ministers of the Republic of Uzbekistan. In the year of 2022, 300kWh capacity solar panels installed at Tashkent city hall building, 100kWh at the Tashkent branch of Mendeleev Institute, and State Tax committee became 80% self-sufficient by solar.

Research and development 
International Institute of Solar Energy, part of Academy of Sciences of the Republic of Uzbekistan, is a center for research, development, and testing of solar power technologies. Solar furnace in Parkent is used in the research and scientific processes of the Materials Science Institute of Academy of Sciences of the Republic of Uzbekistan. The facility has a total capacity of 1,000 kW and is heated and processed by solid state fusion processes and sunlight.

See also 

 Energy in Uzbekistan
 Solar furnace of Uzbekistan

References 

Solar energy in Asia
Uzbekistan
Energy in Uzbekistan